Faithless is a live album by Richard Thompson. Released in 2004 on Thompson's own Beeswing label, it is compiled from recordings made during Thompson's 1985 tour in support of his Across A Crowded Room album, and consequently features 6 of the 9 songs from that album.

The backing band for the 1985 tour included the duo of Clive Gregson and Christine Collister whose vocals had been a feature of Across A Crowded Room. The band lineup for this tour placed most of the burden for instrument colour on Thompson and his guitar playing, but Gregson trades solos with Thompson on "Tear Stained Letter".

Track listing
All songs composed by Richard Thompson; except "Skull and Cross Bones" by Barbara Morgan and "Did She Jump Or Was She Pushed" by Richard and Linda Thompson.

"Fire In The Engine Room"
"Nearly In Love"
"Did She Jump Or Was She Pushed"
"You Don't Say"
"For Shame Of Doing Wrong"
"Little Blue Number"
"How I Wanted To"
"I Ain't Going To Drag My Feet No More"
"Shoot Out The Lights"
"She Twists The Knife Again"
"Love In A Faithless Country"
"Wall Of Death"
"Tear Stained Letter"
"Withered And Died"
"Skull and Cross Bones"

Personnel
Richard Thompson - guitar and vocals
Clive Gregson - guitar, backing vocals and electric organ
Christine Collister - backing vocals, percussion and acoustic guitar on Wall Of Death
Gerry Conway - drums
Rory MacFarlane - bass guitar and backing vocals

References 
http://www.richardthompson-music.com/

2004 live albums
Richard Thompson (musician) live albums